Mehmet Bülent İnal (born 19 May 1973) is a Turkish actor.

He graduated from Ege University, and Dokuz Eylül University Department of Theatre. His recent television project is Payitaht: Abdülhamid.

Filmography

References

External links
 
 Bülent İnal Your Favorite Actor

1973 births
Living people
People from Şanlıurfa
Turkish male television actors
Ege University alumni
Dokuz Eylül University alumni